Lycophron (born about 330–325 BC) was a Hellenistic Greek tragic poet, grammarian, sophist, and commentator on comedy, to whom the poem Alexandra is attributed (perhaps falsely).

Life and miscellaneous works
He was born at Chalcis in Euboea, and flourished at Alexandria in the time of Ptolemy Philadelphus (285–247 BC). According to the Suda, the massive tenth century Byzantine Greek historical encyclopaedia, he was the son of Socles, but was adopted by Lycus of Rhegium. He was entrusted by Ptolemy with the task of arranging the comedies in the Library of Alexandria; as the result of his labours he composed a treatise On Comedy. Lycophron is also said to have been a skilful writer of anagrams.

Tragedies
The poetic compositions of Lycophron chiefly consisted of tragedies, which secured him a place in the Pleiad of Alexandrian tragedians.  The Suda gives the titles of twenty tragedies, of which a very few fragments have been preserved: Aeolus, Allies (Symmakhoi), Andromeda, Chrysippus, Daughters of Aeolus, Daughters of Pelops, Elephenor, Herakles, Hippolytus, Kassandreis, Laius, Marathonians, Menedemus, Nauplius, Oedipus (two versions), Orphan (Orphanos), Pentheus, Suppliants (Hiketai), Telegonus, and the Wanderer (Aletes).  Among these, a few well-turned lines show a much better style than the Alexandra.   Lycophron's tragedies are said to have been much admired by Menedemus of Eretria, although Lycophron had ridiculed him in a satyr play.

The Alexandra
One poem traditionally attributed to him, Alexandra or Cassandra, has been preserved in its complete form, running to 1474 iambic trimeters. It consists of a prophecy uttered by Cassandra and relates the later fortunes of Troy and of the Greek and Trojan heroes. References to events of mythical and later times are introduced, and the poem ends with a reference to Alexander the Great, who was to unite Asia and Europe in his world-wide empire.

The style obtained for the poem's author, even among the ancients, the title of "obscure"; one modern scholar says the Alexandra "may be the most illegible piece of classical literature, one which nobody can read without a proper commentary and which even then makes very difficult reading."  The poem is evidently intended to display the writer's knowledge of obscure names and uncommon myths; it is full of unusual words of doubtful meaning gathered from the older poets, and long-winded compounds coined by the author. It was probably written as a show-piece for the Alexandrian school, rather than as straight poetry. It was very popular in the Byzantine period, and was read and commented on very frequently; the manuscripts of the Alexandra are numerous.  Two explanatory paraphrases of the poem survive, and the collection of scholia by Isaac and John Tzetzes is very valuable (much used by, among others, Robert Graves in his Greek Myths).

A pseudepigraphic work?
Some modern studies have concluded that the Alexandra cannot be the work of the third-century BC author; in one scholar's summary of this view, the poem was:written in the immediate aftermath of the victory of Flamininus at Battle of Cynoscephalae over Philip V of Macedon in 197/6 BC. The author, whose true name and place of origin are probably concealed beneath the impenetrably enigmatic biographical tradition concerning "Lycophron," probably used the name, and some of the literary substance, of Lycophron, not in emulation, but as an ironic reminiscence of the earlier writer, who had combined the practice of tragedy and the elucidation of comedy. Only on this assumption of a deliberate pseudepigraphon can the full irony of his work be appreciated.

The question turns on passages in the poem (1226–1280; cf. 1446-1450) that describe Roman dominance in terms that only fit the situation after the Second Macedonian War.  Cassandra prophesies that her Trojan ancestors' descendants "shall with their spears win the foremost crown of glory, obtaining the sceptre and monarchy of earth and sea" and elaborates with allusions to the course of historical events.  Some scholars, such as Stephanie West, regard these passages as interpolations and defend the attribution of the bulk of the poem to Lycophron the tragic poet. Thomas Nelson and Katherine Molesworth have argued that 'Lycophron' is a pen name to signpost the poem's style, aligning it with the 'frigidity' of Lycophron the sophist.

Editions
 Aldus Manutius (1513), Aldine Press, editio princeps
 John Potter (1697, 1702)
 Ludwig Bachmann (1830), with notes and Scaliger's Latin verse translation online
 Félix Désiré Dehèque (1853), with French translation, Latin paraphrase, and notes online
 Gottfried Kinkel (1880)
 Eduard Scheer (1881–1908), including the paraphrases and Tzetzian scholia
 Carl von Holzinger (1895), Teubner edition with German translation and commentary online
 Emanuele Ciaceri (1901), edition with Italian translation and commentary online
 George W. Mooney (1921), edition with facing English translation and explanatory notes. {reprinted Arno Press, 1979]
 Lorenzo Mascialino (1964), Teubner edition
 Pascal Quignard, Lycophron. Alexandra, Paris, Mercure de France (1971)
 André Hurst and Antje Kolde (2008), Budé edition
 Simon Hornblower (repr. 2017), with translation and commentary

Translations
 Philip Yorke, Viscount Royston (1784 - 1808, posthumously published 1832) online
 A. W. Mair (1921), Loeb Classical Library (online at the Internet Archive; online on Google Books)
 George W. Mooney (1921)

References

Further reading
Studies
 Konze, J. De Dictione Lycophronis (1870)
 Ulrich von Wilamowitz-Moellendorff, De Lycophronis Alexandra (1884) online
 Hornblower, Simon (2018) Lykophron's Alexandra, Rome, and the Hellenistic World (Oxford) 
 McNelis, Charles and Sens, Alex (2016) The Alexandra of Lycophron: A Literary Study (Oxford) 
 Nelson, Thomas J. and Molesworth, Katherine (2021) ‘Tragic Noise and Aristotelian Frigidity in Lycophron’s Alexandra’, Classical Quarterly 71, 200–215
 Rozokoki, Alexandra (2019) The negative presentation of the Greeks in Lycophron’s Alexandra and the dating of the poem.

External links
 Online text: Lycophron's Alexandra translated by A. W. Mair, 1921
 An ancient Life of Lycophron, compiled by Tzetzes

Ancient Euboeans
Ancient Greek dramatists and playwrights
Ancient Greek poets
Ancient Greek grammarians
3rd-century BC Greek people
3rd-century BC poets
Tragic poets
Sophists
Ptolemaic court
Anagrammatists